Richard "Dick" Newick (May 9, 1926 in Hackensack, New Jersey – August 28, 2013 in Sebastopol, California)  more frequently known as Dick Newick  was a multihull sailboat designer.

He grew up in Rutherford, New Jersey. At 10 he built two kayaks with his father and brother. At 12 he designed and built two more by himself. At 14 he sold kayak plans to a schoolmate for $5. After school he spent some time in the United States Navy and earned a degree from the University of California, Berkeley. He ran a boat shop, worked charitably with Quakers in Mexico, then explored Europe by kayak. He sailed to St. Croix in the United States Virgin Islands where he met and married his wife Patricia Ann Moe. They lived in Martha's Vineyard, Massachusetts and Kittery Point, Maine and had two daughters, Lark Blair and Valery Wright, both of whom have boat designs named after them.

He believed in reincarnation, and said he had been a Polynesian boat builder in a previous life. He lauded simplicity of design, safe seagoing performance, aesthetics, and speed under sail.

Newick was at the forefront of the 1960s revival of multihulls, helping to reform their aesthetic and influencing later designs such as the AC72. He was inducted into the North American Boat Designers Hall of Fame in 2008.

Designs

See also
Multihull
Nathanael Greene Herreshoff
Proa
Trimaran

References

Multihull designers
People from Hackensack, New Jersey
People from Rutherford, New Jersey
University of California, Berkeley alumni
1926 births
2013 deaths